Simcoe was an electoral district of the Legislative Assembly of the Parliament of the Province of Canada, in Canada West (now Ontario). It was created in 1841, upon the establishment of the Province of Canada by the union of Upper Canada and Lower Canada. Simcoe was represented by one member in the Legislative Assembly.  It was abolished in the redistribution of 1853, when it was split into Simcoe North and Simcoe South.

Boundaries 

Simcoe electoral district was based on Simcoe County, in the central portion of what is now southern Ontario.

The Union Act, 1840 had merged the two provinces of Upper Canada and Lower Canada into the Province of Canada, with a single Parliament.  The separate parliaments of Lower Canada and Upper Canada were abolished.  The Union Act provided that the pre-existing electoral boundaries of Upper Canada would continue to be used in the new Parliament, unless altered by the Union Act itself.

Simcoe County had been an electoral district in the Legislative Assembly of Upper Canada, and its boundaries were not altered by the Union Act. Those boundaries had originally been set by a statute of Upper Canada in 1798:

In 1837, the Legislature further defined the boundaries of Simcoe County as follows:

Since Simcoe was not changed by the Union Act, those boundaries continued to be used for the new electoral district. Simcoe was represented by one member in the Legislative Assembly.

Members of the Legislative Assembly 

Simcoe was represented by one member in the Legislative Assembly. The following were the members for Simcoe.

Abolition 

Simcoe electoral district was abolished in the re-distribution of 1853, when it was split into Simcoe North and Simcoe South.

References 

Electoral districts of Canada West